Doshan Tappeh Airport  is located in the Piroozi street (Formerly Farahabad) east of Tehran, the capital of Iran. It is in the middle of IRIAF main base. Nowadays the airport is closed since it is surrounded by houses and other urban areas. In the last decade the airport was used as a flight training base for IRIAF and there was some glider and kite flights within it, but now all of the flights are stopped. The airport runways are still in operational condition to serve emergency flights during probable earthquakes or other accidents in eastern Tehran. This airport and other offices of IRIAF have occupied a lot of space in urban area of eastern Tehran and are one of the main reasons for very heavy traffic in Piroozi street and Damavand street.

References

Iranian airbases
Transport in Tehran